The table below lists the judgments of the Constitutional Court of South Africa delivered in 2011.

The members of the court at the start of 2011 were Chief Justice Sandile Ngcobo, Deputy Chief Justice Dikgang Moseneke, and judges Edwin Cameron, Johan Froneman, Chris Jafta, Sisi Khampepe, Mogoeng Mogoeng, Bess Nkabinde, Thembile Skweyiya, Johann van der Westhuizen and Zak Yacoob. Chief Justice Ngcobo retired in August and Justice Mogoeng was elevated to the post of Chief Justice. The vacant seat was not filled during the year.

References
 
 

2011
Constitutional Court
Constitutional Court of South Africa